Protector II is a video game written by Mike Potter for the Atari 8-bit family and published by Synapse Software in 1982. It is a sequel to 1981's Protector; both games are horizontally scrolling shooters inspired by Defender. Protector II was ported to the Commodore 64, TI-99/4A, and TRS-80 Color Computer.

Gameplay
Protector II is a game in which the player has to use the needlefighter ship to rescue people from a city being attacked by aliens.

Reception
Allen Doum reviewed the game for Computer Gaming World:

References

Reviews
Electronic Fun with Computers & Games - Apr, 1983
Tilt - Nov, 1982

External links
Addison Wesley Book of Atari Software 1984
1984 Software Encyclopedia from Electronic Games
Computer Games top 200 list from 1985
Review in Ahoy!
Review in SoftSide
Review in Video Games Player
Review in Consumer Guide's "The Best Texas Instruments Software"

1982 video games
Alien invasions in video games
Atari 8-bit family games
Commodore 64 games
Horizontally scrolling shooters
Synapse Software games
TI-99/4A games
TRS-80 Color Computer games
Video games developed in the United States